The Port of General Santos, also known as the Makar Port, is a seaport in General Santos in the Philippines.

The port is used to transport cargo in and out of General Santos, serving the wider Soccsksargen region. From 2008 until 2018, the seaport did not serve domestic passenger services. Passenger services was briefly resumed in October 2018 with 2Go Travel serving Davao City, Zamboanga City, Iloilo City, and Manila for eight months. 2go resumed its Davao City route by 2021. The Philippine Ports Authority is working to expand the seaport's passenger operations.

In September 2021, a new Port Operations Building (POB) complex for the seaport was inaugurated.

References

General Santos Port
Buildings and structures in General Santos